The Republic of Ireland national football team represents the Republic of Ireland in men's international football. It is governed by the Football Association of Ireland (FAI). 

The team made their debut at the 1924 Summer Olympics, reaching the quarter-finals. Between 1924 and 1936, the team competed as the Irish Free State and from then until 1950, it was referred to by the FAI as Éire or Ireland. During the same period, another Ireland team also existed; this was overseen by the Irish Football Association (IFA) and had previously been the sole national team for the entire island of Ireland. In 1953, FIFA decreed that for competitive matches in tournaments that both Irish teams could enter, the FAI team would be officially called Republic of Ireland while the IFA team was to be named Northern Ireland. Northern Ireland was allowed to keep using the title Ireland by FIFA in the British Home Championship (which was discontinued in 1984). The Republic of Ireland was the first nation from outside the United Kingdom to defeat England at home, in a fixture played at Goodison Park, Liverpool, in 1949. The team reached the quarter-final stage of the 1964 European Nations' Cup, where they lost to the eventual champions Spain.

Under the guidance of Jack Charlton, the team enjoyed their most successful era, reaching their highest FIFA world ranking ever at sixth in August 1993, and qualifying for UEFA Euro 1988 in their first appearance at the UEFA European Championship, reaching the quarter-finals of the 1990 FIFA World Cup in their first ever appearance at the finals, as well as making the last 16 at the 1994 edition. Charlton's successor Mick McCarthy lost out on the next two major tournaments but ultimately qualified for the 2002 World Cup making it to the last 16 a feat repeated at the 2016 Euros by manager Martin O'Neill.

The team's home stadium is the Aviva Stadium, in Dublin, although some of their home games have been played in other stadiums across the country. Their traditional colours are green shirts and white shorts. The current head coach is Stephen Kenny, and the captain is Séamus Coleman.

History

1920s–1980s
Between 1882 and 1924, Ireland was represented by a single national football team organised by the Belfast-based Irish Football Association (IFA). In 1920, Ireland was partitioned into Northern Ireland and the Irish Free State (the latter in turn becoming Éire or Ireland after adopting a new Constitution in 1937, followed by declaring itself a republic in 1949.) Following the initial political upheavals surrounding Partition, a Dublin-based organisation calling itself the Football Association of the Irish Free State (FAIFS) split from the IFA in 1921 and began organising its own league and national football team.

In 1923, the FAIFS was recognised by FIFA as the governing body of football in the Irish Free State and at the 1924 Summer Olympics, the Irish Free State made their international debut. On 28 May, at the Stade Olympique, they beat Bulgaria 1–0, with Paddy Duncan scoring the team's first-ever goal. As a result, they qualified for the quarter-finals where they lost to the Netherlands. On 14 June 1924, the Irish Free State made their home debut against the United States, who had embarked on a brief European tour after competing in the same Summer Olympics. Ed Brookes scored a hat-trick in a 3–1 home win at Dalymount Park.

The Irish Free State did not play their next game until 21 March 1926, an away game against Italy lost 3–0. In subsequent years, the status of the Olympic Games football competition was downgraded and as a result, this game is widely regarded as the Irish Free State's first official game. On 25 February 1934, the Irish Free State made their FIFA World Cup debut, drawing 4–4 with Belgium at Dalymount Park in a 1934 FIFA World Cup qualifier. Paddy Moore scored all four of the Free State's goals and became the first player ever to score four goals in a World Cup game.

After 1936, they reverted to the designation "Football Association of Ireland" and began to refer to their team as Éire or "Ireland". During this entire period, there were two Irish international football teams, chosen by two rival Associations. Both Associations, the Northern Ireland-based IFA and the Irish Free State-based FAI claimed jurisdiction over the whole of Ireland and considered themselves entitled to select players from the entire island. At least 38 dual internationals were selected to represent both teams, however the overwhelming majority of these were Southerners who also agreed to play for the IFA team, with only a bare handful "crossing the border" in the other direction.

A 2–0 win over England at Goodison Park on 21 September 1949 was the first time England suffered a home defeat by a team outside the Home Countries of Scotland, Wales and the Ireland team run by the Belfast-based Irish FA. FIFA eventually intervened when both teams entered 1950 World Cup qualification, the first time they had entered the same competition. Four players – Tom Aherne, Reg Ryan, Davy Walsh, Con Martin – actually played for the two different teams in the same FIFA World Cup tournament. All four players concerned had been born in the Irish Free State and made their full international debut in FAI colours before agreeing to represent the IFA team. This may have alarmed the FAI since they subsequently lobbied FIFA to prevent the IFA from picking Southern-born players (as well as attempting to exert pressure on the players themselves, sometimes through their clubs). FIFA's response was to restrict the eligibility of players on the basis of the (political) border, further ruling in 1953 that neither team could be referred to as Ireland in competitions which both teams were eligible to enter; i.e., initially the FIFA World Cup and subsequently the European Nations Cup (now the UEFA European Football Championship). FIFA decreed that the FAI team officially be called the Republic of Ireland while the IFA team was to be named Northern Ireland.

In 1953, FIFA renamed the team from "Ireland" to "Republic of Ireland". The 1958 World Cup qualifiers saw the Republic of Ireland drawn with England. In their home game against England, Alf Ringstead put the hosts 1–0 up before John Atyeo equalised in the last minute to salvage a 1–1 draw for England. Under the rules of the day, a win for the Republic of Ireland would have meant a play-off with England for a place in the World Cup.

After reaching the quarter-finals of the 1964 European Nations' Cup, the Republic of Ireland was drawn to face Spain and Syria in 1966 World Cup qualifying. Despite Syria's withdrawal, this was still considered a qualifying group with the Irish winning 1–0 at home and losing 4–1 away. This meant a play-off at the Parc des Princes in Paris, which Spain won 1–0 Eamon Dunphy made his Ireland debut in this game. The play-off was originally scheduled to take place at Wembley Stadium in London, home to a large Irish diaspora, but the FAI agreed with the Royal Spanish Football Federation to have the match moved to Paris, where a large Spanish diaspora lived. The FAI was criticised for this move to boost revenue from gate receipts.

In 1965, the Republic of Ireland team made history when selecting Manchester United full-back Shay Brennan for the senior national team. This was the first instance of a player born outside the Republic being selected to play for the national team due to having an Irish parent. Since then, many of the Republic's most prominent players have been born in England, including Mark Lawrenson, David O'Leary, John Aldridge, Tony Cascarino and David Kelly. A number of players born in Scotland, including Ray Houghton, have since represented the Republic due to having Irish parentage. The selection rules were later relaxed to allow for the selection of players with an Irish grandparent.

In 1969, the FAI appointed Mick Meagan as the first permanent manager of the national side. His two years in charge were marked by exceptionally poor results, however with the team losing five out of six matches and gaining just one point in their 1970 World Cup qualification, and doing no better in the UEFA Euro 1972 qualifiers, leading to his dismissal. His replacement, Liam Tuohy, did a somewhat better in the 1974 qualification, and more importantly, oversaw major improvements to the national team's training facilities and persuaded many English club sides to end their policies of not releasing Irish players for international games during the domestic season. Ultimately, however, the team still failed to qualify for the World Cup, and Tuohy resigned following a dispute over his wages. Johnny Giles became the side's first player-manager in the 1970s. This was followed by the debut of a young Liam Brady and results improved markedly. The side missed out on the 1978 World Cup by two points, having defeated France at home during qualification. After a less than impressive performance at Euro 1980 qualifying, in which the team finished well behind group winners England and Northern Ireland, Giles resigned, saying that he had taken the national side as far as he could.

Eoin Hand took over as manager for the 1982 World Cup qualifiers, and once more the Republic of Ireland narrowly missed out on qualification, this time on goal difference behind France, whom they had defeated at home once more. Disappointing qualifying campaigns for both Euro 1984 and the 1986 World Cup followed, ending Hand's time in charge.

1986–1995: The golden generation
In 1986, the Republic of Ireland appointed Jack Charlton, a top rated English manager who had been part of England's World Cup-winning side of 1966. During the 1970s, he had developed Middlesbrough into a side which provided many players to the dominant Liverpool team of the time.

After taking charge of the Republic of Ireland, Charlton influenced changes in the national side which resulted in the most successful period of its history, qualifying for two World Cups and a European Championship. Prominent players in this period included Paul McGrath, Packie Bonner, Niall Quinn, and the Liverpool trio of Ray Houghton, John Aldridge and Ronnie Whelan.

Ireland's first appearance at a major finals tournament came in Euro 1988. With Ireland's fixtures already complete, qualification was secured through Gary Mackay's 87th-minute goal in Sofia when Scotland beat Bulgaria 1–0; the Scottish win left Ireland top of the group. In spite of the enforced absence of Liam Brady and Mark Lawrenson from their squad, in the finals in West Germany, Ireland shocked Europe by beating England 1–0 in Stuttgart with a header from Ray Houghton in their competitive debut; drew 1–1 with the Soviet Union in Hannover, with Ronnie Whelan the scorer; and lost to eventual champions the Netherlands 1–0 in Gelsenkirchen, coming within seven minutes of a draw that would have meant a semi-final place.

The Republic of Ireland's longest competitive winning streak was achieved in 1989 during the 1990 World Cup qualifying campaign. Five games against Spain, Northern Ireland, Hungary and Malta twice, were all wins. Subsequently, the side made it to the 1990 World Cup in Italy. Three draws in the group stage against England, Egypt and the Netherlands were enough to make the knockout stage. Virtually the entire country watched as they beat Romania on penalties, with Packie Bonner making a vital save and David O'Leary scoring the decisive spot-kick. Ireland was then beaten 1–0 by hosts Italy in the quarter-final at the Stadio Olimpico in Rome. During the tournament, the team had an audience with Pope John Paul II, the only team to do so.

After missing out on Euro 1992 (despite being unbeaten in qualifying), the Republic of Ireland qualified for the 1994 World Cup, held in the United States, via a qualification group which again included Spain and Northern Ireland, and ended with the Republic finishing above European champions Denmark by a very narrow margin (goals scored). In their first match at the 1994 finals, they beat the previous World Cup hosts and third-place finishers, Italy, 1–0 in their opening game at Giants Stadium just outside New York City, but lost to Mexico 2–1 at the Citrus Bowl in the heat and humidity of Orlando, Florida. They ended the group stage with a 0–0 draw with Norway at Giants Stadium, in East Rutherford, New Jersey. With these results, they made it to the second round, eventually losing 2–0 to the Netherlands in Orlando.

Ireland finished second behind Portugal in Euro 1996 qualifying's Group 6, but narrowly missed out on the Euro 1996 finals after losing 2–0 to the Netherlands in a play-off, played at Anfield between the two worst group runners-up, with Patrick Kluivert scoring both goals to send his team through. It was Jack Charlton's final game as manager.

1996–2007: Post Golden Generation and decline
Charlton was replaced by Mick McCarthy but Ireland still missed out on the next two major tournaments. Ireland just managed to finish second to Romania in their 1998 World Cup qualification campaign after Tony Cascarino scored a late goal to win the away match with Lithuania. A play-off with Belgium followed, with the match at Lansdowne Road finishing in a 1–1 draw, the match in Belgium finishing 2–1 to the home team and substitute David Connolly being sent off in the latter, preventing Ireland from progressing to the 1998 World Cup. FIFA awarded the FIFA Fair Play Award for 1997 to the Irish supporters "for their exemplary behaviour at Ireland team matches, especially the FIFA World Cup qualifying play-offs against Belgium". Ireland's opponents in UEFA Euro 2000 qualifying Group 8 were Yugoslavia, Croatia, Malta and North Macedonia. North Macedonia scored a last-minute equaliser that denied Ireland top spot in the group; instead, they faced Turkey in a play-off to decide which team would participate in Euro 2000. The match in Dublin finished in a 1–1 draw, although Turkey qualified through the away goals rule after a 0–0 draw, at the end of which Tony Cascarino became involved in a fight and retired from international football.

Ireland took on both Portugal and the Netherlands in 2002 World Cup qualifiers in UEFA's Group 2, ending the group in second place with 24 points from 10 matches (seven victories and three draws). Despite this unbeaten run, Ireland were drawn in a play-off with Iran. The match in Dublin finished in a 2–0 victory to Ireland with goals from Ian Harte (penalty) and Robbie Keane, while the match in Tehran, played in front of 100,000 spectators, finished in a 1–0 win for Iran. McCarthy thus managed to lead Ireland to the 2002 World Cup final stages, though only for the team to lose inspirational captain Roy Keane due to the pair's infamous public spat in Saipan. 1–1 draws with Cameroon and Germany were followed by a 3–0 victory over Saudi Arabia in Group E. The Irish once again progressed to the knockout stage, only losing narrowly 3–2 on penalties to Spain in Suwon after Robbie Keane's last minute equalising penalty kick forced the game into extra time.

After a poor start to qualifying for Euro 2004, McCarthy was replaced by Brian Kerr, but he too struggled to guide the side to the tournament or the subsequent 2006 World Cup in Germany, and was ultimately sacked in October 2005. Kerr was replaced by Steve Staunton (assisted by Bobby Robson in the position of "international football consultant") in January 2006. Under Staunton, results varied widely but the team still failed to qualify for Euro 2008 and Staunton lost the position in October 2007. His reign included a humiliating 5–2 defeat to Cyprus during the qualifiers' Group D, one of the worst defeats in the team's history.

2008–2019: Trapattoni & O'Neill spells in charge and Mick McCarthy's return

Giovanni Trapattoni was appointed manager in February 2008 following a spell with assistant coach Don Givens in charge. Trapattoni went through all ten first round 2010 World Cup qualifying games unbeaten, winning four of the ten games. Ireland lost out on a place in the finals, however, after a controversial, narrow loss to France in the play-offs. Ireland went down 1–0 in the first leg, and lost 2–1 on aggregate, with William Gallas scoring a controversial goal in extra time in the second leg after Thierry Henry had handled the ball before crossing for Gallas to score. This followed another controversy over FIFA's last-minute decision to seed the play-off draw.

In 2011, Ireland hosted and won the inaugural Nations Cup with wins against Wales, Northern Ireland, and Scotland without conceding a goal.

In their Euro 2012 qualifying group, Ireland finished second, losing only the home fixture against Russia. They thus reached the play-offs and were drawn against Estonia, whom they beat 5–1 on aggregate. Euro 2012 was Ireland's first major tournament since 2002, but in Group C they lost all three matches, against Croatia, Spain, and Italy. UEFA, however, announced a special award for the fans of the Irish team, who notably sang in the last few minutes against Spain, despite trailing 4–0.	

Ireland was drawn in Group C of UEFA's 2014 World Cup qualification alongside Germany, Sweden, Austria, the Faroe Islands and Kazakhstan. On 12 October, Ireland suffered their largest ever competitive home defeat, 6–1 against Germany, at the Aviva Stadium. Ireland then lost against Sweden and Austria in early September 2013, effectively ending the qualification campaign, and Giovanni Trapattoni resigned as team manager the following day. Noel King was appointed interim senior manager on 23 September 2013 following his resignation.

On 5 November 2013, the FAI announced that Martin O'Neill would be Trapattoni's replacement as manager, with former team captain Roy Keane as his assistant. They assumed their roles when the team met on 11 November where they won against Latvia 3–0 and drew against Poland 0–0.

For the Euro 2016 qualification phase, the Republic of Ireland was drawn in Group D against Georgia, Germany, Gibraltar, Poland and Scotland. The team played against Gibraltar for the first time, beating them 7–0, and achieved an away draw against World Cup champions, Germany, a few days later in October 2014.

On 8 October 2015, the Republic of Ireland beat world champions Germany 1–0 in a Euro 2016 qualifier at the Aviva Stadium. Shane Long scored the game's only goal with an excellent finish in the 70th minute, rewarding the Republic of Ireland's impressive defensive display. The result, hailed as one of the Republic of Ireland's greatest, guaranteed the Republic of Ireland a play-off place at least, with hopes of automatic qualification still a reality going into the final group game against Poland in Warsaw. A win, or a draw of 2–2 or more, would guarantee at least second place in the group and ensure automatic qualification for the finals in France. The Republic of Ireland, however, lost 2–1, thus entering them into the play-offs.

The draw for the Euro 2016 Play-off was held in Nyon, Switzerland, on 18 October 2015. Ireland were unseeded in the draw, meaning they could face one of Bosnia and Herzegovina, Ukraine, Sweden or Hungary. Ireland were drawn against Bosnia and Herzegovina, the top seeded team in the play-off. The only previous meeting between the teams resulted in a 1–0 win for the Republic of Ireland in a friendly in 2012, Shane Long scoring the game's only goal. Owing to injuries and suspensions, Ireland had only the "B" squad available for the first leg of the play-off, played in Bilino Polje Stadium. A goal from Robbie Brady almost secured a victory for the Irish until Edin Džeko equalised 1–1 to end off the match. In the second leg played at the Aviva Stadium, Jonathan Walters scored two goals leading to a 2–0 victory for the Irish. In the end, Ireland won the play-off 3–1 on aggregate, qualifying them for Euro 2016.

At the tournament's final stages in France, Ireland were drawn into Group E against Italy, Belgium and Sweden. In their opener at the Stade de France in Saint-Denis, Paris, Wes Hoolahan scored the opener with a spectacular half-volley off a Séamus Coleman cross, but Sweden equalised after Ciaran Clark headed into his own net attempting to clear a cross from Zlatan Ibrahimović, leading to a 1–1 draw. At the Nouveau Stade de Bordeaux against Belgium, the Belgians cruised to a 3–0 victory after two goals from Romelu Lukaku and one from Axel Witsel, leaving Ireland needing to win their final match against already qualified Italy to qualify for the knockout stage. Against Italy at the Stade Pierre-Mauroy in Villeneuve-d'Ascq, Lille, Ireland played strongly but were five minutes plus stoppage time away from elimination when Robbie Brady headed in Hoolahan's cross. The Republic held on to win 1–0, sending Ireland through as one of the four best third-place teams. On 26 June, Ireland played France in the round of 16 in Lyon. Ireland took the lead in the match with an early penalty from Robbie Brady, but France went on to win 2–1 to advance to the quarter-finals.

The 2018 World Cup qualification draw took place on 25 July 2015 when the team were drawn in Group D against Austria, Georgia, Moldova, Serbia and Wales. Ireland started qualifying strongly with a hard-fought 2–2 draw away to Serbia preceding two impressive victories over Georgia and Moldova.

On 12 November 2016, Ireland beat Austria in Vienna to go top of the 2018 World Cup qualifying group. However, a run of three draws against Wales, Austria and Georgia followed by a devastating 1–0 loss at home to Serbia looked to have diminished any chances of the Republic of Ireland qualifying for the 2018 World Cup. The Republic of Ireland were soon back on form however after securing a 2–0 victory at home to Moldova thanks to a brace from Daryl Murphy.

On 9 October 2017, Ireland defeated Wales 1–0 in Cardiff to qualify for the qualification play-offs after a James McClean goal fired Ireland to second place in the group. They went on to play Denmark in the play-offs.

In the first leg of the play-offs on 11 November, Ireland drew 0–0 against Denmark in Copenhagen. In the second leg on 14 November in Dublin, Ireland lost 5–1 to Denmark after taking the lead in the game. Shane Duffy's early header looked to have given the Republic of Ireland hope in qualifying for their first World Cup since 2002, however, an Andreas Christensen goal, a Christian Eriksen hat-trick and a late Nicklas Bendtner penalty shattered Irish dreams.

Ireland competed in the first UEFA Nations League from September to November in 2018 and went on to finish bottom of their group, picking up just two points in two 0–0 draws against Denmark and were relegated to League C for the 2020–21 UEFA Nations League.

On 21 November 2018, Martin O'Neill and Roy Keane left their posts with the Ireland senior team following a run of poor results.

The FAI confirmed on the weekend of 23 November 2018, Mick McCarthy's appointment as the Republic of Ireland manager after the 59-year-old agreed to return to the role following a meeting with chief executive John Delaney. McCarthy appointed Terry Connor as his assistant, who he had worked with at Wolverhampton Wanderers and Ipswich Town respectively. Ireland's record goalscorer Robbie Keane was announced as a member of the backroom team. He started poorly with an unconvincing 1–0 win over Gibraltar after having previously beaten them 7–0 and 4–0 in the past. However, a good performance against Georgia saw another 1–0 win thanks to a Conor Hourihane free kick. The wins left them top of the group, a position they still held three matches later in mid-September 2019, with just three matches remaining. Ireland failed to automatically qualify and were placed into a semi-final play-off against Slovakia.

2020–present: Stephen Kenny era
On 4 April 2020, amid the global COVID-19 pandemic, McCarthy stood down as manager and was immediately replaced by Stephen Kenny. On 3 September 2020, Ireland drew 1–1 away to Bulgaria in Kenny's first match as manager. The following month, Ireland played its postponed Euro 2020 semi-final play-off match against Slovakia. The match finished 0–0 after extra time and a 4–2 penalty shootout defeat saw Slovakia progress to the play-off final.

In March 2021, Ireland played two 2022 FIFA World Cup qualifiers; losing 3–2 away to Serbia before losing at home 1–0 to Luxembourg. Ireland would ultimately fail to qualify for the World Cup as they ended the campaign with a third-place finish in their group.

On 8 June 2021, Chiedozie Ogbene became the first ever African-born player to represent the Republic of Ireland, when he made his debut in a 0–0 draw away to Hungary.

Team image

Kits 

Traditionally, the team has played in a home strip of green shirt, white shorts and green socks. The second strip is usually the reverse of these colours, although there have been exceptions, such as an orange shirt in the late 1990s. Squad numbers are either white with an orange trim, on the home shirts, or green with an orange trim. The FAI logo appears at the bottom of the numbering.

A limited edition grey shirt was used just once, in a match against Wales on 17 November 2007. A black jersey with a green stripe across the chest was worn in the final game of the 2011 Nations Cup against Scotland and in a friendly against Italy in Liège, Belgium.

The previous kit was supplied by Umbro since 1994. In March 2009, Umbro signed a deal with the FAI to keep them as kit suppliers to the team until 2020. However New Balance became kit suppliers in August 2017. This deal only lasted 3 years before Umbro returned as kit suppliers in November 2020.

Home stadium and other venues

Since the 1980s, most home matches have been played at Lansdowne Road, Dublin, the national rugby stadium owned by the Irish Rugby Football Union (IRFU). The ground was closed for redevelopment in 2007, with the replacement ground, the Aviva Stadium, opening on 14 May 2010. The first football match in the Aviva was Manchester United against a League of Ireland XI side, managed by Damien Richardson, on 4 August 2010. Manchester United won the game 7–1, with Park Ji-Sung scoring the first ever goal in the Aviva Stadium. Aviva Stadium is jointly owned by the IRFU and FAI, although it will return to solely IRFU ownership on expiry of the current 60-year lease. The first football international played at Lansdowne Road by a FAI team was a friendly against Italy in 1971 (an IFA team first played in 1878 against England); a 5–0 victory over San Marino in a UEFA Euro 2008 qualifying Group D match on 15 November 2006 was the last game there before the reconstruction. The all-seater capacity of Lansdowne Road prior to the renovation was 36,000, although higher attendances, using the standing only areas, were permitted for friendly matches. The Aviva Stadium's status as an all-seater increased capacity for competitive games to 51,700. The opening game at the Aviva Stadium, a controversial 1–0 friendly defeat to Argentina, was noted for Robbie Keane securing his membership in the FIFA Century Club and manager Giovanni Trapattoni's absence due to surgery, with assistant manager Marco Tardelli taking charge.

With the announcement of the rebuilding of Lansdowne Road, a new venue was required to stage the Republic of Ireland's home internationals. The only stadium in Ireland deemed suitable to stage international football was the 84,500 capacity Croke Park, home of the Gaelic Athletic Association (GAA). To accommodate this, the GAA temporarily relaxed its rule governing the playing of "foreign" games on its property. Initially, four UEFA Euro 2008 qualifying Group D matches were played at Croke Park in 2007, resulting in two wins and two draws. The GAA initially agreed to allow the FAI use until the end of 2008, and later extended the permission until the completion of Aviva Stadium. The Hill 16 end of Croke Park is a terrace, which means like Lansdowne Road before it, the capacity of the stadium was reduced to around 74,500 for competitive matches as temporary seating must be used.

Prior to the 1980s, the Republic of Ireland played most home games at Dalymount Park, home of Bohemians, but progressively more games were played at Lansdowne Road following a safety review which reduced Dalymount's capacity. The last international match played there was against Morocco in 1990. The Republic of Ireland have also played home matches in Tolka Park (twice) and the RDS Arena in Dublin as well at the Mardyke and Flower Lodge grounds in Cork. These games in Cork were, until 2009, the only two home Irish internationals played outside of Dublin. During the construction of the Aviva Stadium, two friendly games were played in Thomond Park, Limerick, in 2009. Two further friendlies were played in the RDS Arena in May 2010. Ireland played a friendly against Belarus in Cork's 7,000 capacity Turners Cross stadium in May 2016.

Media coverage
Ireland matches currently broadcast by Raidió Teilifís Éireann (RTÉ) (qualifiers only), Sky Sports, and highlights on Virgin Media Television. Sky Sports shows most of Ireland's friendly matches, while RTÉ shows competitive games such as World Cup and European Championship qualifiers. RTÉ briefly lost its broadcast rights in 2002 when the FAI controversially sold them in a multi-million deal to Sky Sports, a subscription based satellite channel. The decision was criticised by fans and politicians, and the Consumers' Association of Ireland (CAI) described the FAI as "greedy". The FAI was eventually forced to reverse its decision and to allow RTÉ to continue its broadcasts after the government intervened to stop the sale of important Irish sporting events to non-terrestrial television broadcasters. RTÉ (for qualifiers) and Eir Sport (for friendlies) will hold the rights until 2018.

Selection and nationality issues
The selection of young players born in Northern Ireland, especially those who have already represented Northern Ireland at youth level, into Republic of Ireland national teams has been controversial, as these players are able to claim Irish nationality even though born and brought up outside the Republic's territory. This has led to accusations of unfairness and predatory behaviour. In Northern Ireland it is seen by Northern Ireland supporters as having the effect of dividing international football in their country along sectarian lines, whereby Nationalists will declare for the Republic of Ireland while Unionists continue to play for Northern Ireland. It has also been argued that it is actually the sectarian divisions, which already existed in Northern Irish football, that are a factor in a number of players switching to the Republic. Traditionally, those in Northern Ireland who identify as Irish, predominantly Catholics and nationalists, support the Republic of Ireland team.

Fixtures and results

2022

2023

Coaching staff
The senior men's management team includes:

Coaching history
Between 1921 and 1969, a committee of selectors chose the team, on occasions a coach or team manager was appointed; Mick Meagan was the first manager to actually select the team. Managers from the periods in which the national side was known as the Irish Free State or simply Ireland are obscure and many are not currently known, however it is known that Val Harris, Bill Lacey and Alex Stevenson managed the side.

Players

Current squad
The following players were called up for the friendly match against Latvia and UEFA Euro 2024 qualifying match against France in March 2023.

Caps and goals updated as of 20 November 2022 after the match against Malta.

Recent call-ups
The following players have also been called up to the Republic of Ireland squad within the last 12 months.

INJ Withdrew from latest squad due to injury
PRE Preliminary squad / standby
RET Player retired from the national team
SUS Player is suspended
COVID Withdrew from latest squad due to Covid-19 protocols

Player records

Players in bold are still active with Ireland.

Most caps

Most goals

Competitive record

FIFA World Cup

In the 1934 qualifiers, Paddy Moore (v. Belgium) became the first player anywhere to score 4 goals in a World Cup match. For the 1950 World Cup, after three qualified teams withdrew, FIFA invited the FAI to compete as a replacement, however they declined. During qualification for the 1962 World Cup, it was the only qualifying tournament in which the team had a 0% record. During qualification for the 1966 World Cup, Ireland reached their first play-off against Spain. Goal difference did not count, so a play-off was contested at the Stade Colombes, Paris, and Ireland failed to progress. Ireland almost qualified but lost on goal difference to France in a tough and tight group. Fans lamented some controversial refereeing decisions.

For the 1990 World Cup, Ireland reached the quarter finals of the tournament for the first time in their history. It was Ireland's first ever participation in a FIFA World Cup. Ireland played England in the first drawing 1–1. Ireland drew the next two matches but ultimately qualified for the knockout stages where they played Romania. The match ended 0–0 and Ireland won on penalties 5–4 which sent Ireland into the quarter-final showdown against the tournament host Italy. There Ireland lost 1–0 via a Salvatore Schillaci goal in the 38th minute that sent the Irish out of the competition.

In 1994, Ireland participated in their second consecutive World Cup. This time they were drawn with Mexico, Norway and Italy. Ireland won their first game against Italy which was the first time Ireland had won a World Cup match and their first ever victory over Italy with a notable goal from Ray Houghton. Ireland lost against Mexico in the second group match and drew with Norway but still made to the knockout phase where they faced the Netherlands. Ireland lost 2–0.

For the 1998 qualification campaign, Ireland scraped into the play-offs largely due to Tony Cascarino's seven goals in ten games. They lost in the play-off against Belgium, drawing 1–1 in the first leg then losing 2–1 in the second leg. Although for next campaign Ireland were drawn with two big European nations, the Netherlands, Portugal. Ireland went the whole campaign unbeaten, beating the Netherlands 1–0 in the process; Jason McAteer scored the sole goal.

At the start of the tournament, captain Roy Keane and manager Mick McCarthy where involved in a "bust up" and Keane was sent home. Despite this, McCarthy did not call up a replacement and continued with 22 players. Ireland drew in their first match against Cameroon and in their second match they drew again against the tournaments runner up Germany. In Ireland's final group match, they defeated Saudi Arabia, their second ever victory in a World Cup and progressed them to the round of 16. Ireland met Spain and lost in penalty shootout.

With failure to qualify for the 2006 World Cup, Ireland reached a play-off against France for a place at the 2010 World Cup.

France's Thierry Henry's handball stirred international controversy after the move set up William Gallas to score in extra-time of the second leg of the play-off; the referee did not notice and allowed the goal to stand, leading to widespread media controversy, protests at the French embassy in Dublin and comments from senior government officials from both countries.

Draws include knockout matches decided via penalty shoot-out.

UEFA European Championship

Ireland reached the quarter finals of the 1964 European Nations Cup.

Ireland did not qualify for a European Championship until Euro 1988. On 12 June 1988 in Stuttgart, the Irish team took to the pitch in its first match at a major championship finals against England. Ray Houghton of Liverpool scored the only goal of the match as Ireland recorded a memorable and historic victory. The game is fondly remembered in Irish folklore through the song "Joxer goes to Stuttgart" by Irish folk legend Christy Moore. Ireland took on the former Soviet Union next and took the lead late in the first half via a spectacular volley from Liverpool's Ronnie Whelan. Unfortunately for both Whelan and Ireland the lead was cancelled out midway through the second half by Oleh Protasov as the match ended in a 1–1 draw. In their final match, Ireland lost out to the Netherlands 1–0.

It was not until 2011 that Ireland clinched a place at another European Championship, qualifying for Euro 2012 with a 5–1 aggregate victory over Estonia. At the tournament itself, however, Ireland lost all three of its matches and conceded nine goals, the nation's worst performance in a major tournament to date.

Ireland qualified to Euro 2016 following a play-off victory over Bosnia and Herzegovina. In the group stages they drew 1–1 with Sweden, having initially taken the lead through a Wes Hoolahan strike, before being beaten 3–0 by Belgium in the following game. However, a 1–0 victory over Italy in their final game, courtesy of a late header from Robbie Brady, earned the side a spot in the round of 16, the first time the team had ever advanced from the group stage at a European Championship. In the round of 16, Ireland faced the hosts France and, after taking an early lead through a Brady penalty, were beaten 2–1.

UEFA Nations League

*Denotes draws including knockout matches decided on penalty kicks.
**Gold background colour indicates that the tournament was won.
***Red border colour indicates tournament was held on home soil.

Other tournaments

Opponents

The team's head-to-head records against all 80 nations whom they have played to date ( 'B' internationals were played against Italy and West Germany in the past), including friendly internationals: Three of these teams no longer exist (Czechoslovakia, the Soviet Union and Yugoslavia), so Ireland have played against 80 of the 211 FIFA members: 52 UEFA, 8 CONMEBOL, 7 CAF, 6 CONCACAF, 6 AFC and 1 OFC members as of 9 June 2022. The only UEFA members against whom Ireland have not played are Kosovo and Slovenia.

Honours

Major:
FIFA World Cup
Quarter Finalists : 1990
Round of 16: 1994, 2002
UEFA European Championship
Round of 16: 2016
Summer Olympics
Quarter-Finalists: 1924

Minor:
Celtic Nations Cup
Winners: 2011
Iceland Triangular Tournament
Winners: 1986

Other:
FIFA Fair Play Award: 1997
Unofficial Football World Championships:
Holders: 30 March 1977 – 1 July 1977, 31 March 2004 – 29 May 2004

See also
Republic of Ireland B national football team
Republic of Ireland women's national football team
Republic of Ireland national under-21 football team
Republic of Ireland national under-19 football team
Republic of Ireland national under-17 football team

References

External links

 
 Republic of Ireland at FIFA
 Republic of Ireland at UEFA
 Archive of most-capped players and highest goalscorers at RSSSF
 Reports for all matches of Republic of Ireland national football team
 Complete results and line-ups

 
1924 establishments in Ireland
Ireland, Republic of
Football Association of Ireland
National sports teams established in 1924